Secret Handshake(s) may refer to:
 Secret handshake, a distinct form of greeting that conveys membership in or loyalty to a group
 The Secret Handshake (film), a 2015 film directed by Howie Klausner
 The Secret Handshake, electronica/soul musical project of Luis Dubuc
 Secret Handshakes, a 2010 album by Tub Ring
 Secret Handshake, a 2012 album by Anthony da Costa
 The Secret Handshake,  album by Geoff Muldaur